The Spirit Lake Community School District is a rural public school district based in Spirit Lake, Iowa, United States.  In addition to Spirit Lake, the district also serves Orleans, portions of Okoboji and Superior, as well as rural areas in north central and northeastern Dickinson County.

Schools
 Spirit Lake High School (grades 9–12)
 Spirit Lake Middle School (grades 5–8)
 Spirit Lake Elementary School (grades K–4)

Spirit Lake High School

Athletics
The Indians compete in the Lakes Conference in the following sports:

Baseball (boys)
Basketball (boys and girls)
Cross Country (boys and girls)
 Boys' Two-time Class 2A State Champions (2008, 2009)
Football
 Two-time Class 2A State Champions (2012, 2015)
Golf (boys and girls)
Soccer (boys and girls)
Softball (girls)
 2004 Class 3A State Champions
Swimming (boys and girls)
Tennis (boys and girls)
Track and Field (boys and girls)
 Boys' 2-time State Champions (1968, 1992)
Volleyball (girls)
Wrestling

See also
List of school districts in Iowa
List of high schools in Iowa

References

External links
 

School districts in Iowa
Education in Dickinson County, Iowa